L.A. Plays Itself is a 1972 American experimental gay pornographic film, directed and produced by Fred Halsted.

At the film's screening, Salvador Dalí was reportedly quoted as saying, "new information for me".

Legacy
The film is featured in Los Angeles Plays Itself, a documentary by Thom Andersen, which also borrows its name from the film.

See also
 List of American films of 1972

References

External links 
 
 Plot summary at Mubi

1970s pornographic films
1972 films
Films set in Los Angeles County, California
Gay pornographic films
1970s English-language films
American pornographic films
American LGBT-related films
American avant-garde and experimental films
1970s American films